Slime City Massacre is a 2010 American science fiction comedy horror film directed by Greg Lamberson and starring Jennifer Bihl, Kealan Patrick Burke, Debbie Rochon and Robert Sabin. It is a sequel to the 1988 film Slime City, also directed by Lamberson.

Plot
A dirty bomb has decimated New York City's financial district and reduced midtown to a post-apocalyptic nightmare. The neighborhood known as Slime City has been evacuated, except for the homeless, and in the ruins of a soup kitchen four squatters discover a supply of food that transforms them into hideous slimy creatures (like Zachary), driven to murder. Meanwhile, a greedy developer who has set his sights on Slime City hires a team of mercenaries to wipe out the creatures.

Cast

Release
Slime City Massacre had its world premiere at the Beloit International Film Festival in Beloit, Wisconsin. The film was released on a special edition DVD by Media Blasters in 2011.

References

External links
 

2010 films
2010s comedy horror films
2010 horror films
2010s science fiction horror films
American slasher films
American comedy horror films
American science fiction comedy films
American science fiction horror films
Films shot in New York City
American sequel films
2010 comedy films
2010s English-language films
2010s American films
2010s slasher films

ru:Город слизи